The Derry Castle was a 1,367 ton iron barque built at Glasgow in 1883, and initially operating out of Limerick, Ireland. She had been registered there on 19 November 1883 by Francis Spaight & Sons. In 1887 while voyaging from Australia to the United Kingdom with a cargo of wheat, she foundered off Enderby Island, in the subantarctic Auckland Islands, on a reef which now bears her name.

Shipwreck 
On 20 March 1887, the Derry Castle, ran aground off Enderby Island, nine days into her journey en route from Geelong, Victoria to Falmouth, Cornwall. Manned by a crew of twenty-three, she carried one passenger and a cargo of wheat. At the time, the Derry Castle bore a Boston, Massachusetts, registration and was owned by P. Richardson & Co. She was under the command of Captain J. Goffe.

After foundering, eight of the 23 crew made it ashore. At that time the New Zealand government maintained a number of castaway depots on their subantarctic islands equipped with emergency supplies. Unfortunately, the depot at Sandy Bay on Enderby Island had been looted of all but a bottle of salt. The castaways constructed crude shelters and subsisted on shellfish and a small quantity of wheat recovered from the wreck.

On a cliff overlooking the water, they buried the bodies of their fellow crew members that had washed ashore. The grave was marked with the ship's figurehead.

After 92 days they discovered an axe head in the sand and were able to build a boat which became known as the Derry Castle Punt from the wreckage. Two men navigated the boat to nearby Erebus Cove, Port Ross on Auckland Island, where they obtained supplies from the government depot there. The group lived at Port Ross until rescued by the 45 ton steamer Awarua on 19 July.

The Awarua arrived in Hobson's Bay, Victoria on 21 September 1887, returning from an illegal sealing expedition in the Auckland Islands. The punt remained on the Main Auckland Island until in 1989, when during an expedition which included artists Bill Hammond, Laurence Aberhart, Geerda Leenards and Lloyd Godman, it was transported back to the Southland Museum and Art Gallery at Invercargill on a Royal New Zealand Navy vessel where it is on permanent display. Only 192 days after leaving Geelong, the Derry Castle had been officially posted as missing by Lloyd's of London.

The Castle grave site was maintained for many years by the New Zealand government until it sank into the ground. However, during World War II, the figurehead was resurrected by those stationed on the islands. The figurehead can now be viewed (along with other items from the wreck) at the Canterbury Museum in Christchurch, New Zealand. The makeshift punt was used as a grave headstone for a while before being removed to the Southland Museum, where it is on display. In its place, a plaque now marks the site of the sailors' graves.

Notes

References

External links 

 Derry Castle at clydeships.co.uk
 Derry Castle details, New Zealand Bound site
 Museum of New Zealand Te Papa Tongarewa topic file
 Images relating to Derry Castle from the collection of the Museum of New Zealand Te Papa Tongarewa
 Timaru Herald report 1888 
 Derry Castle Reef: site of the wreck
 Derry Castle lifesaving buoy
 Photograph of punt, Te Ara Encyclopaedia

1883 ships
1887 in New Zealand
Maritime incidents in March 1887
Ships built in Govan
Shipwrecks of the Auckland Islands